Ockershausen is a borough (Ortsbezirk) of Marburg in Hesse.

References

External links 
 Ockershausen at marburg.de 
 

Districts of Marburg
Marburg-Biedenkopf